Shuttlecock at the 2009 Asian Indoor Games was held in Hoang Mai Gymnasium, Hanoi, Vietnam from 2 November to 7 November 2009.

Medalists

Medal table

Results

Men's singles

Men's doubles

Men's team

Round 1
2–3 November

Knockout round

Women's singles

Women's doubles

Women's team

Round 1
2–3 November

Knockout round

References
 Official site

2009 Asian Indoor Games events